The Verona funicular, also known as the San Pietro Castle funicular, is an incline lift in the Veronetta district of Verona, Italy.  The lift previously operated as a funicular railway and is still officially named after the funicular.

Originally constructed as a funicular, the line opened in 1941 to provide access to the  near the ancient Roman theatre.  The funicular closed three years later as San Pietro's function as a tourist attraction failed to materialize at the time.

In the 2000s, the Verona municipal government explored options to reopen the long abandoned railway. Eventually, it was decided to re-purpose the funicular as an incline lift and the new service was completed in 2017. The current service includes two termini and an intermediate stop. The line is served by a single 25-person capacity cabin.

References

External links
Funicolare di Castel San Pietro

Transport in Verona
Inclined elevators